R. Ajay Gnanamuthu (born 15 September 1988) is an Indian film director and screenwriter works primarily in Tamil cinema. He started his career assisting producer-filmmaker A. R. Murugadoss in the films 7aum Arivu and Thuppakki. In 2015, he debuted as  director with the horror-thriller film Demonte Colony. His second fim was Imaikkaa Nodigal.

Personal life 
Gnanamuthu completed his schooling at St. John's High School and St. Patrick's Anglo Indian Higher Secondary School and later joined Loyola College. During his college days as a student of the visual communications department, he enjoyed making short films.

Career
Gnanamuthu was selected to contest in the short film making show, Naalaya Iyakunar Season-1 in 2010 where he finished as one of the finalists. He then joined filmmaker A. R. Murugadoss as an assistant director, and worked in films such as 7aum Arivu (2011) and Thuppakki (2012).

He directed Demonte Colony in 2015, Imaikkaa Nodigal in 2018 and Cobra in 2022.

Filmography

References

External links
 

Tamil film directors
Tamil-language film directors
Tamil screenwriters
Artists from Madurai
Film directors from Tamil Nadu
Living people
1987 births
Screenwriters from Tamil Nadu